"Ooh La La" is a song by English singer-songwriter Jessie Ware from her fourth studio album, What's Your Pleasure? (2020). It was written by Ware, Danny Parker, Shungudzo Kuyimbia, and James Ford. Production was handled by Ford of the duo Simian Mobile Disco. The song was released on 24 April 2020. A remix by Miss Honey Dijon was released on 24 June 2020.

Music video
The music video was released on 24 April 2020 on YouTube. It was directed by Gemma Yin. According to Ware, it was inspired by "innuendo, Pinter and surburbia".

Track listing
Digital download
"Ooh La La" – 3:46

Digital download – Honey Dijon Remix
"Ooh La La" (Honey Dijon Remix) – 3:23

Credits and personnel
Credits adapted from Tidal.

 Jessie Ware – vocals, songwriter
 Danny Parker – songwriter, background vocals
 James Ford – producer, songwriter, mixer, recording engineer, programming, synthesizer, percussion, keyboards 
 Shungudzo Kuyimbia – songwriter, background vocals
 Joe LaPorta – mastering engineer
 Dave Okumu – guitar
 Leo Taylor – drums
 Bim Amoako-Gyampah – background vocals
 Senab Adekunle – background vocals

References

2020 singles
2020 songs
Jessie Ware songs
Song recordings produced by James Ford (musician)
Songs written by Danny Parker (songwriter)
Songs written by James Ford (musician)
Songs written by Jessie Ware
Songs written by Shungudzo
Virgin EMI Records singles